The 9th Street Expressway and the 12th Street Expressway are a pair of spurs connecting Interstate 395 (I-395; Southwest Freeway) with Downtown Washington, D.C. The two carriageways are  apart from each other, and gain their namesake from the roads that they lead into once reaching the downtown Federal Triangle neighborhood.

Both expressways travel underneath the National Mall via the 9th Street Tunnel and the 12th Street Tunnel, which are often seen as alternatives to the nearby 3rd Street Tunnel of I-395.

Route description
The 9th Street Expressway carriageway begins at an intersection with Maine Avenue SW in the Southwest Waterfront neighborhood of the city. This intersection also connects to G Street SW and L'Enfant Promenade. Just north of here, the 9th Street Expressway crosses over I-395 (Southwest Freeway). At this interchange, the 12th Street Expressway begins, feeding traffic off of a ramp that extends onto the Francis Case Memorial Bridge. Northbound I-395 has a direct connection to 12th Street via exit 3, but I-395 south must use exit 4, which also serves Maine Avenue. The 12th Street Expressway has an exit to D Street SW, also serving L'Enfant Promenade and buildings of the General Services Administration. The segment of the 9th Street Expressway between I-395 and D Street in fact tunnels underneath a building on L'Enfant Plaza that houses the National Transportation Safety Board.

Both roads receive on-ramps leading from Independence Avenue, just south of the twin tunnels that travel underneath the National Mall. Now in Federal Triangle of the Northwest quadrant, both roads terminate at an intersection with Constitution Avenue NW, while both rights-of-way continue northbound via 9th and 12th Streets NW. Although signage is rare and quite small, Constitution Avenue at this intersection carries the designation of both U.S. Route 1 (US 1) and US 50.

History

In the late 1960s, the Southwest Freeway and the 9th and 12th Street Expressways both opened. The spur routes originally terminated with I-95, before freeway revolts canceled other projects in the district that resulted in a route designation change.

Exit list
The entire route is in Washington, D.C.

See also

References

Expressways in the United States
Roads in Washington, D.C.
Tunnels in Washington, D.C.
Road tunnels in the United States